Águas de Lindoia (Lindoia Waters) is a Brazilian municipality of the state of São Paulo. The population is 18,808 (2020 est.) in an area of 60.1 km2. It is a tourist spot in part due to its hot springs, being part of the Circuito das Águas, also including the cities of Amparo, Jaguariúna, Lindoia, Monte Alegre, Pedreira, Serra Negra and Socorro.

History 
Before the 20th-century, the location was only known by adventurers who crossed the woods searching for gold. Having contracted diseases during their journeys, these adventurers found the cure in the warm waters that flowed from the mountains. 

In 1909, an Italian doctor, Francisco Tozzi, learned from his own father, Henrique Tozzi, about the medicinal properties of the springs. Dr Francisco Tozzi lived in Serra Negra, and ended up buying the region auctioned by the government, making the property a public space.

Leisure and business 
165 km from São Paulo City, Águas de Lindoia offers the hot springs, adventure sports, and agritourism. Its economy is based on tourism.

The city's population is 17,266 inhabitants. There are 1.500 apartments and 25 hotels with the capacity to host 5,000 guests per day, allowing it to host several large Congresses and conventions per year, some nearing in size to 4,000 participants.

References

External links 

 

Municipalities in São Paulo (state)
Populated places established in 1909
1909 establishments in Brazil
Lindoia